Storm Abigail was the first storm to be officially named (jointly) by the Met Office of the United Kingdom and Met Éireann of the Republic of Ireland, on 10 November 2015. It brought high winds, rain, lightning, and wintry showers across the north and northwest of Scotland.

History

On 10 November, a Chief Meteorologist at the Met Office said: "There remains some uncertainty regarding the exact extent and timing of strongest winds but current forecasts suggest that this storm could have some medium impacts such as disruption to transport and so a warning has been issued and the first storm has been named as Abigail."

On 12 November, local ferries were affected by bad weather with many services cancelled. It was announced that every school in the Western Isles and Shetland were to be closed to pupils on 13 November. The storm left more than 20,000 homes without power, according to energy company SSE.

The Scottish Environment Protection Agency also warned of the risk of flooding due to the storm, as the weather system was anticipated to create a storm surge along the south-west and west coast, due to coincidence with a high tide.

Background

Earlier in 2015, the Met Office and Met Éireann announced a pilot project to name wind storms and asked the public for suggestions. The full list of names, common to both the UK and Ireland, chosen for future selection are: Abigail, Barney, Clodagh, Desmond, Eva, Frank, Gertrude, Henry, Imogen, Jake, Katie, Lawrence, Mary, Nigel, Orla, Phil, Rhonda, Steve, Tegan, Vernon and Wendy.

A storm will be named when it is deemed able to potentially cause "substantial" impact on the UK or Ireland.

They will be taken from the list, in alphabetical order, alternating between male and female names. This is the same naming convention as that used for tropical cyclones in the United States. Where weather events result from ex-tropical storms or hurricanes, the original name allocated by the National Hurricane Center in the US will be used.

See also

 European windstorm
 Winter storm naming in the UK and Ireland
 2015–16 UK and Ireland windstorm season

References

Abigail
2015 meteorology
2015 in Scotland
Abigail
2015 disasters in the United Kingdom
November 2015 events in Europe